The General Assembly and Church of the First Born (often shortened to just “Church of the First Born”) is a fundamental faith healing sect. This group is an offshoot of the Latter-Day Saints. This group claims no affiliation with the various Mormon fundamentalist groups with similar "Firstborn" names.

Other names Older newspapers refer to them as "Faith preachers" or "Christian Faith".

History
All the baptisms of this sect trace to one David McDonald. McDonald was baptized, and ordained to preach the gospel by John N. Burton and Elias Brewer, in Otoe county, Nebraska, about 1870. He claimed the divine gifts of healing, being reported as having even raised the dead. He left Nebraska for Texas in the spring of 1873, but by the end of the year was living and preaching around Chanute, Kansas. His preaching partners included Marion Reece, Burton, and Frank Shanks.

Marion Reece, a veteran of the Civil War, was baptized, and also immediately called to preach. A great revival happening about 1876 near Arkansas City, Kansas. By September of this year a church, known simply as "The Followers of Christ", was organized. The first elder being Gustave Hunt and a man named Hawthorn the first deacon. This town later became the "port of entry" for those readying themselves for the Oklahoma land rush. By 1880, several hundred members existed in the state of Kansas, though they always met in homes or school houses. McDonald again relocated his family, to Linn County, Kansas where he died in February 1892.

Marion Reece (1844–1917), of Chanute, continued establishing churches after McDonald's death throughout the state of Oklahoma, with around 100 churches existing today that trace to his efforts. It was claimed there were about 1400 brethren in Oklahoma at this time, but since there are no official records it is not indisputable. There was a migration after his death of many to Idaho(Ancestry), where they, although now split into several different sects, still hold to the name Followers of Christ. That group followed Charley Smith, who was a brother-in-law to Reece. Most of Reece's children stayed around Enid, Oklahoma.

Nathan Parisho (1847–1919) and his brother Tommy (1854–1937) were also well known preachers of the faith, establishing many bodies of brethren, including the churches at Indianapolis in 1896). Jim Hays (1854–1916) was another minister of note who is said to have baptized over 1,000 souls in his life from Kansas to Washington and back into Canada. He evangelized and established churches in the Rocky and Fay, Oklahoma communities about 1902.

Military exemption
The elders of the Homestead church, Alonzo McCoy (1871–1955), John F. Keltch (1852–1929), and Con's brother Tom Smith (1855–1921), with other churches such as the one in Indianapolis, sent to Washington D.C. a request, dated 14 September 1918, for national recognition as a church for the purposes of claiming religious exemptions for military service. The document titled "Articles of Faith of the Church of the Firstborn known as the Followers of Christ" incorporates both names by which the group was known. By the next world war the name "General Assembly and Church of the Firstborn" was recognized by all except the Idaho/Oregon group and a small California community and the Enid, Oklahoma group. All still retain the same standards of belief and share blood ties.

References

Christian new religious movements
Fundamentalist denominations
Faith healers
American faith healers